Revolutionary Youth Front is the youth wing of Revolutionary Socialist Party in India.

Youth wings of communist parties of India
Mass organisations of the Revolutionary Socialist Party (India)